August Ludvig Lindgren (August 1, 1883 – June 1, 1945) was a Danish amateur football (soccer) player in the midfielder position, who won a silver medal with the Danish national team in the 1908 Summer Olympics football tournament. He scored two goals in three games at the tournament. In all, Lindgren played four games and scored three goals for the Danish national team. He played his club football with Boldklubben af 1893.

References

External links
Danish national team profile
DatabaseOlympics profile

1883 births
1945 deaths
Danish men's footballers
Denmark international footballers
Boldklubben af 1893 players
Footballers at the 1908 Summer Olympics
Olympic footballers of Denmark
Olympic silver medalists for Denmark
Olympic medalists in football
Association football forwards
Medalists at the 1908 Summer Olympics